Margaret Warner Morley (February 17, 1858 in Montrose, Iowa – December 12, 1923 in Washington, D.C.) was an American educator, biologist, and author of many children's books on nature and biology.

Biography 
Morley grew up in Brooklyn. She studied at State University of New York at Oswego and Hunter College. She continued her biology education at the Armour Institute (now the Illinois Institute of Technology) in Chicago and at the Woods Hole marine laboratory in Massachusetts. She worked as a teacher and was considered an expert in agriculture and beekeeping. She was most well known for her work as an illustrator, photographer, and author of books on nature.

As early as 1890 she visited Tryon, North Carolina with the painter Amelia Watson where she resided in the cottage of playwright William Gillette. She finally acquired her own home in Tryon where she lived for many years.

In one of her many trips she went to Europe to the Val Gardena the valley of toy carvers where she was inspired to write the novel Donkey John of the toy valley.

A collection of Morley's work is held at the Harriet Beecher Stowe Center in Hartford, Connecticut. The collection consists of travel logs and sketchbooks of rural North Carolina, and book manuscripts.

The North Carolina Museum of History owns a collection of original photographs that Morley donated to the museum in 1914.

Morley died on the 12 December 1923.

Drawings 
Drawings by Morley from the original Val Gardena toys from  Donkey John of the Toy Valley:

Writings 
 Song of Life 1891
 Physical culture 1893
 Flowers and Their Friends 1897
 A few familiar flowers: how to love them at home or in school 1897
 Seed babies 1898
 Little Wanderers 1899
 “ The Honey Makers “ 1899
 Down north and up along 1900
 Wasps and their ways 1901
 Insect Folk 1903
 Little Mitchell, the Story of a Mountain Squirrel 1904
 The Renewal of Life: How and When to Tell the Story to the Young 1906
 Donkey John of the toy valley. Chicago A. C. McClurg & Co. 1909
 Grasshopper Land 1910
 The Carolina Mountains, Boston: Houghton Mifflin Co (1913)
 Will o' the wasps 1913
 The Bee People 1914
 the Apple-Tree Sprite 1915

References

Further reading

External links 

 
 
 
 Margaret Warner Morley Collection at the Harriet Beecher Stowe Center

1858 births
1923 deaths
American educators
American nature writers
Hunter College alumni
People from Lee County, Iowa
Writers from Iowa
Women science writers
People from Tryon, North Carolina
American women non-fiction writers